The  Australian National Memorial, Villers-Bretonneux is the main memorial to Australian military personnel killed on the Western Front during World War I. It is located on the Route Villiers-Bretonneux (D 23), between the towns of Fouilloy and Villers-Bretonneux, in the Somme département, France. The memorial lists 10,773 names of soldiers of the Australian Imperial Force with no known grave who were killed between 1916, when Australian forces arrived in France and Belgium, and the end of the war. The location was chosen to commemorate the role played by Australian soldiers in the Second Battle of Villers-Bretonneux (24–27 April 1918).

Designed by Sir Edwin Lutyens, the memorial consists of a tower within the Villers-Bretonneux Military Cemetery, which also includes a Cross of Sacrifice. The tower is surrounded by walls and panels on which the names of the missing dead are listed. The main inscription is in both French and English, on either side of the entrance to the tower. The memorial and cemetery are maintained by the Commonwealth War Graves Commission.

History of the memorial
Following the war, the commander of the Australian Corps, Lieutenant General Sir Talbot Hobbs chose the sites of several Australian memorials in Europe and proposed that a memorial to all of the Australian dead on the Western Front be built in France, in the Villers-Bretonneux area. The proposal was approved by the Australian government – still led by wartime Prime Minister Billy Hughes – in 1923. A competition to design the memorial was held in 1925. It was open only to Australian veterans and their parents; their entries were required to use only stone quarried in Australia. The competition was won by the Melbourne architect William Lucas. In 1929, the French government gave its approval to the project.

The Scullin government suspended the project in 1930, due to the Great Depression and the projected cost, as well as dissatisfaction with aesthetic elements of Lucas's design. Following a 1935 visit to Australia by the head of the Imperial War Graves Commission, Sir Fabian Ware, a cheaper design was sought, using French stone, from Sir Edwin Lutyens.

Construction of the memorial took place in 1936 and 1937. It was unveiled on 22 July 1938 by King George VI, whose words were broadcast directly to Australia. Other dignitaries present included the French President Albert Lebrun, who also gave a speech, and the Australian deputy prime minister Earle Page. Accompanying the King was his wife Queen Elizabeth, whose brother was killed at the Battle of Loos. This memorial was the last of the great memorials to the missing of World War I to be built, and the Second World War broke out just over a year after its unveiling. During the unveiling ceremony, the King closed his speech with the words:
"They rest in peace, while over them all Australia's tower keeps watch and ward."

Every year on 25 April, an Anzac Day Dawn Service is conducted at the memorial by the Australian Government Department of Veterans' Affairs. The service commences at 5.30am and is followed by community services in Villers-Bretonneux and Bullecourt.

The cemetery originally included 60 hornbeam trees, planted in 1928. These were removed in 2009 as they reached the end of their lives, and were replaced by new trees as part of plans for the centenary commemorations in 2018.

The Sir John Monash Centre, an interpretive centre behind the Villers–Bretonneux Australian National Memorial, opened in April 2018.

Notable Commemoratees
Private Thomas Cooke – New Zealand-born Australian Army VC recipient.

Footnotes and references

External links

Commonwealth War Graves Commission details of the Villers–Bretonneux Memorial
Villers–Bretonneux, Australian National Memorial – history and description of the memorial and pictures of the unveiling ceremony and of details of the memorial (Department of Veteran Affairs, Australia)
British-Pathé Newsreel report that includes the unveiling of the memorial, unveiling is at 2:14 to 2:51 (Adobe Flash)
Australian National War Memorial, Villers-Bretonneux, France (William Lucas, 1930, Argonaut Press) – book by Lucas on his rejected plans for the memorial (catalogue entry from the National Library of Australia)
Anzac Day Dawn Service at the Australian National Memorial, Villers-Bretonneux

Australian military memorials
Commonwealth War Graves Commission memorials
World War I memorials in France
Buildings and structures completed in 1938
Monuments and memorials in Somme (department)
Australia–France relations
Works of Edwin Lutyens in France
War memorials by Edwin Lutyens
Australian diaspora in Europe